is a Japanese web manga series written and illustrated by Ogeretsu Tanaka. Yarichin Bitch Club has been self-published on Pixiv since 2012, and in 2016 it received a print publication by Gentosha.

In 2018, the webcomic also received two original animated videos by Grizzly, released direct-to-DVD.

Plot
Takashi Tōno is a freshman student who is transferred from Tokyo to Morimori Academy, a private college prep boarding high school located deep in the mountains. Soon after arriving, he befriends Kyōsuke Yaguchi, who is a member of the soccer club and invites Tōno to join him in the club. Tōno's lack of interest in sports forces him to enter the quietest club of all: the photography club. However, the photography club is not what it seems, since the members' duties consist of having sex with other students of the school.

Characters

Tōno was transferred to Morimori Academy from Tokyo due to his father's job. Unfortunately he entered the Yarichin Club believing it was just a normal photography club. He is hopeless at sports (especially ball games) and gets shy around people, and is often shocked by the activities of the Yarichin Club, frequently walking in on them by accident. He develops a crush on Yaguchi.

The second new transfer student to Morimori Academy. Joined the photography club for photos, but it had nothing to do with photography. He is good at studying and grew up in a big family. He likes Tōno and pretends to be in a relationship with him to prevent him from being raped after the monthly sex results, leading to him actually developing a major crush on him.

Nicknamed “Yacchan”, Kashima's cousin and a member of the soccer club. Yaguchi is Tōno's only friend in class, and they strike up an easy friendship, with Tōno soon developing feelings for him. He comes off as cheerful and kind, and is very popular in class, but this is merely a facade; in reality, he is deeply troubled by jealousy from Kashima, who he looks up to as a master, and is actually a very dark and angry person when faced.

A second year student. He is a versatile, meaning he can be either a top or a bottom, and behaves very oddly, speaking in broken sentences and slurred words and frequently making random noises. Despite this, he is one of the smartest students in the entire school, and takes extra classes and tests.

A second year student who has an unrequited love towards Yaguchi. He has a great sense of loyalty and likes to do disgusting things to people. He can't express his thoughts very well, and usually ends up saying the complete opposite of what he intends.

President of the Yarichin Club and Itome's boyfriend. Enrolled in Morimori Academy since middle school, he is half Japanese and half French. His full name is Keiichi Claude Akemi.

Akemi's boyfriend, a silent member of Yarichin Club with a romantic personality. Usually a top, but is a bottom when having sex with Akemi. Itome is deeply in love with Akemi and hails from a rich family.

A clean freak with a persecution complex, and a hypochondriac towards most things except sex. Likes wearing women's clothing. He is a bottom and frequently suffers at the hands of Matsumura, a teacher, who blackmails him into having sex with him.

A first year student who becomes obsessed with Yuri after he saved his life when he tried to commit suicide by jumping from the roof of the school.

A chemistry teacher at Morimori Academy. He is eventually revealed to be in a secret relationship with Shikatani, and will frequently have sex with him in the classroom when school hours are over; however, he is blackmailing him.

Media

Manga

Yarichin Bitch Club is written and illustrated by Ogeretsu Tanaka, who had been posting it on Pixiv since 2012. The webcomic later received a print publication by Gentosha in 2016, with chapters being released in five bound volumes.

The manga has been licensed for publication in the United States by SuBLime, while in Germany by Egmont Manga under the name of Come to where the Bitch Boys are.

Drama CD

A series of audio dramas were released on CD by Ginger Records. The first drama CD was announced with the release of volume 1 of the manga and was later released on June 10, 2016. The second drama CD was released on August 25, 2017.

OVA

An original animated DVD was announced at AnimeJapan 2018 at Toho's booth. It was released direct-to-video on DVD on September 21, 2018 as part of a bundle with the limited edition of volume 3 of the manga. It was animated by Grizzly, with Ai Yoshimura directing, Noel Mizuki in charge of series composition, Koji Haneda in charge of character designs, Shūji Katayama in charge of music, and Kisuke Koizumi in charge of sound directing. The cast from the drama CDs reprised their roles. A second episode was released on April 17, 2019 as a separate Blu-ray and DVD titled Morimori Version, which also included episode 1, a 16-page exclusive manga by Ogeretsu Tanaka, and an audio drama CD. The home release was given an R-15 rating.

The theme song is "Touch You" by Shiritsu Morimori Gakuen Seishun Danshis, with the cast members performing as their characters. "Touch You" is composed by Yuyoyuppe, with lyrics written by Ogeretsu Tanaka, the original author of the manga. "Touch You" was released as a single on August 15, 2018 and included individual versions of the song for all nine characters. In November 2020, "Touch You" charted #4 in the Global Viral Top 10 on Spotify in the United States and England after it gained popularity on TikTok, in part due to unofficial mash-ups with the 2020 song "WAP" by Cardi B and Megan Thee Stallion.

Discography

Singles

References

External links
 Original webcomic on Pixiv 
  
 OVA Official Website 
 
 

2010s webcomics
2012 webcomic debuts
2018 anime OVAs
Japanese webcomics
Yaoi anime and manga
Gentosha manga
Grizzly (studio)
SuBLime manga
Viz Media manga
Webcomics in print
LGBT in anime and manga
2010s LGBT literature